The 1929 Bath by-election was a parliamentary by-election held on 21 March 1929 for the constituency of Bath in Somerset.

Vacancy
The by-election was caused by the death of the sitting MP, the Unionist Charles Foxcroft on 11 February 1929. He had been the MP since the October 1918 by-election, apart from 1923-24 following his defeat to the Liberals.

History
Before 1918, Bath was a two-member seat that had regularly changed hands between Unioinsts and Liberals. Since 1918, the Unionists had won on every occasion apart from the 1923 general election, when the Liberal, Frank Raffety won, thanks to the absence of a Labour candidate. Raffety was defeated by Foxcroft at the last General Election when Labour intervened;

Candidates
The Unionist candidate was the Honorable Charles Baillie-Hamilton, younger brother of the Earl of Haddington. 
The Liberal candidate was a recently retired Indian civil servant, 56-year-old Sidney Daniels, rather than the previous Liberal MP, Frank Raffety who had been selected to contest Cheltenham at the pending General Election. Daniels had spent 33 years in India before returning to England to practice law in 1928. This was his first parliamentary election.
The Labour candidate was a barrister and journalist, George Gilbert Desmond.

Campaign
Polling Day was fixed for 21 March 1929, just 38 days after the death of the former MP. This left little time for campaigning.
Since a general election was due in May and the Liberal and Labour parties were not strong in the constituency, little effort was put into the campaign.
On 1 March, nationally, Liberal leader, David Lloyd George launched the Liberal programme for the upcoming General election, titled We Can Conquer Unemployment.

Result
On polling day, news came through of a Liberal by-election victory at Eddisbury the day before, however this news came too late to influence the campaign. The Unionists held the seat with a reduced majority;

Aftermath
All three fought the seat in the general election in May with a similar outcome;

References 

1929 in England
1929 elections in the United Kingdom
Politics of Bath, Somerset
By-elections to the Parliament of the United Kingdom in Somerset constituencies
20th century in Somerset